Tristemma is a genus of flowering plants belonging to the family Melastomataceae.

Its native range is Africa.

Species:
 Tristemma akeassii Jacq.-Fél. 
 Tristemma albiflorum Benth. 
 Tristemma camerunense Jacq.-Fél.
 Tristemma coronatum Benth.
 Tristemma demeusei De Wild.
 Tristemma hirtum P. Beauv.
 Tristemma involucratum Benth.
 Tristemma leiocalyx Cogn.
 Tristemma littorale Benth.
 Tristemma mauritianum J. F. Gmel.
 Tristemma oreophilum Gilg
 Tristemma oreothamnos Mildbr. ex Mildbr.
 Tristemma rubens A. Fern. & R. Fern.
 Tristemma schliebenii Markgr.
 Tristemma vestitum Jacq.-Fél.

References

Melastomataceae
Melastomataceae genera